Suomen täydelliset venälaisnaiset  is a Finnish reality television series that debuted on Liv on August 28, 2015. It is inspired by The Real Housewives.

Houswives
 Elena Lukkarinen
 Valeria Hirvonen
 Alisa Ranta-aho
 Regina Slepak
 Joe Satratzemi Togou, Togou is a fashion designer, twice divorced with one child.
 Fofi Mastrokosta, Mastrokosta is married with one child.

References

2010s Finnish television series
2015 Finnish television series debuts
Television shows set in Finland
Liv (TV channel) original programming
Finnish television series based on American television series